Archduchess Ilona of Austria (20 April 1927 – 12 January 2011) was a member of the Hungarian Palatine branch of the House of Habsburg-Lorraine. She was married and later divorced from the late head of the House of Mecklenburg-Strelitz, Georg Alexander, Duke of Mecklenburg.

Family and marriage
Archduchess Ilona (Helene) of Austria was born in Budapest, Hungary the second daughter and child of Archduke Joseph Francis of Austria and his wife Princess Anna of Saxony.  Her father was the son of Archduke Joseph August of Austria who was one of the heads of the provisional government of Hungary following the removal of King Charles IV. Her mother was a daughter of the last king of Saxony, Frederick Augustus III.

Ilona married Duke Georg Alexander of Mecklenburg civilly on 20 February 1946 and religiously on 30 April 1946 in Sigmaringen, Württemberg-Hohenzollern during the allied occupation of Germany.  Her husband was the eldest child and heir of George, Duke of Mecklenburg, head of the House of Mecklenburg-Strelitz and his first wife Irina Mikhailovna Raievskya.

On 6 July 1963, following the death of her father in law her husband became the new head of the House of Mecklenburg-Strelitz. Ilona and Georg Alexander had three daughters and a son before divorcing on 12 December 1974.

Ilona died in the morning of 12 January 2011 in Freiburg, Baden-Württemberg, Germany, aged 83.

Children

Ancestry

References

External links
House of Meklenburg-Strelitz website

|-

|-

1927 births
2011 deaths
House of Habsburg-Lorraine
House of Mecklenburg-Strelitz
Austrian princesses
German royalty
Hereditary Grand Duchesses of Mecklenburg-Strelitz
Knights of Malta
Austrian Roman Catholics
Hungarian Roman Catholics
20th-century Roman Catholics
21st-century Roman Catholics
Nobility from Budapest